Nassogne is a municipality of Wallonia located in the province of Luxembourg, Belgium.

On 1 January 2007 the municipality, which covers 111.96 km², had 5,045 inhabitants, giving a population density of 45.1 inhabitants per km².

The municipality consists of the following districts: Ambly, Bande, Forrières, Grune, Harsin, Lesterny, Masbourg (including Mormont), and Nassogne.

See also
 List of protected heritage sites in Nassogne

References

External links
 
Official website (in French)

 
Municipalities of Luxembourg (Belgium)